John Farrar (July 1, 1779 – May 8, 1853) was an American scholar. He first coined the concept of hurricanes as “a moving vortex and not the rushing forward of a great body of the atmosphere”, after the Great September Gale of 1815. Farrar remained Professor of Mathematics and Natural Philosophy at Harvard University between 1807 and 1836. During this time, he introduced modern mathematics into the curriculum. He was also a regular contributor to the scientific journals.

Life and works 
After attending Phillips Academy, Andover, and graduating from Harvard in 1803.  In 1805, he was appointed Greek tutor at Harvard. Farrar was chosen Hollis Professor of Mathematics and Natural Philosophy in 1807. He retained the chair till 1836, when he resigned in consequence of a painful illness that finally caused his death. His second wife, Eliza Ware Farrar (née Rotch), was Flemish. She married him in 1828. She authored several children's books.

Farrar maintained weather records between 1807-1817 at Cambridge, Massachusetts. For the 23 September 1815 hurricane, he particularly noted the shape as "a moving vortex". He also observed the veering of the wind, and its different times of subsequent impacts on the cities of Boston and New York City.

Farrar was elected a Fellow of the American Academy of Arts and Sciences in 1808, and a member of the American Antiquarian Society in 1814.

In 1815, Farrar made efforts to build an observatory at Harvard. However, despite of continuing efforts, the project failed to take off due to lack of funds.
 In his capacity as Hollis Professor of Mathematics and Natural Philosophy, he reformulated the mathematical curriculum and introduced modern mathematics. He prepared the Cambridge mathematical series. He was also the first to translate mathematical works from European languages to make them available for American undergraduates. He published a translation of Lacroix's "Elements of Algebra" (1818), which he followed by selections from Legendre, Biot, Bezant, and others. Harvard, the U.S. military academy, and other institutions at once adopted these works as textbooks. He regularly wrote for the scientific journals North American Review and Memoirs of the American academy. After Farrar's death, Eliza Farrar donated her husband's collection of books to form the original collection of the Lincoln Public Library.

Notes

References

 Elliott, C.A. and Rossiter, M.W. (1992). Science at Harvard University: Historical Perspectives. Lehigh University Press. .
 Fitzpatrick, P.J. (2005). Hurricanes: A Reference Handbook. ABC-CLIO. 
 Ludlum, David M. (1963). Early American Hurricanes, 1492-1870, The History of American Weather. Boston: American Meteorological Society.
 Norcross, B. (2007). Hurricane Almanac: The Essential Guide to Storms Past, Present, and Future. Macmillan Publishers.

External links
 Official website at Harvard
 Farrar, John. (1827) An elementary treatise of Astronomy. Printed by Hilliard, Metcalf and Co, Boston, 1827
 

1779 births
1853 deaths
19th-century American mathematicians
Fellows of the American Academy of Arts and Sciences
Harvard University faculty
People from Cambridge, Massachusetts
Hollis Chair of Mathematics and Natural Philosophy
Harvard College alumni
Members of the American Antiquarian Society
Mathematicians from Massachusetts
Phillips Academy alumni